Aleksandr Petrovych Salnikov  (3 July 1949 – 17 November 2017) was a Ukrainian basketball player who competed for the Soviet Union in the 1976 Summer Olympics and the 1980 Summer Olympics.

References

 

1949 births
2017 deaths
Soviet men's basketball players
1974 FIBA World Championship players
1978 FIBA World Championship players
Olympic basketball players of the Soviet Union
Basketball players at the 1976 Summer Olympics
Basketball players at the 1980 Summer Olympics
Olympic bronze medalists for the Soviet Union
Olympic medalists in basketball
Medalists at the 1980 Summer Olympics
Medalists at the 1976 Summer Olympics
Ukrainian men's basketball players
FIBA World Championship-winning players
Sportspeople from Sevastopol